Phragmacossia dudgeoni is a species of moth of the family Cossidae. It is found in India and Bhutan.

References

Moths described in 1974
Zeuzerinae